Dharmaram Vidya Kshetram is an ecclesiastical institution of higher learning established by the Syrian Catholic congregation of the Carmelites of Mary Immaculate (CMI) for Catholic education, as an independent institute empowered to grant degrees, including Doctorates in Philosophy and Theology. Located in Bengaluru, India, it is a pontifical athenaeum with degree-granting authority validated by the Vatican.

History 

Dharmaram Vidya Kshetram was established at Dharmaram College, the Central Study House of the CMI, an indigenous religious congregation founded in 1831. The Study House which was founded in 1918 at Chethipuzha, Kerala was moved to Bangalore in 1957. By 8 December 1965, it became affiliated to the Pontifical Gregorian University in Rome, which was later made into an autonomous Pontifical Athenaeum, under the direction of the Congregation for Catholic Education, Vatican, and is empowered to award academic degrees up to PhD in Philosophy and Theology, and Licentiate in Philosophy, Theology, Canon Law, and Formative Spirituality and Counselling.

DVK now has various specialist centres and affiliated institutes.

Dharmaram Publications 
Dharmaram Publications publishes books dealing with theological, scriptural and philosophical topics in Christian as well as non-Christian traditions.

Faculty
 Kurian Kachapally, Faculty of Philosophy.
 William Sweet
 Emmanuel Giles Pothanamuzhi, Past Rector
 Joseph Pathrapankal
 Mathew Chandrankunnel, Professor of Philosophy of Science
 Saju Chackalackal, Professor of Philosophy
 A. Mathias Mundadan, Past Rector
 Thomas Aykara, Rector

Alumni
Abraham V. M, Vice-chancellor of Christ University, Bangalore.
 Paul Poovathingal
 Jose Nandhikkara

References

External links 
 https://web.archive.org/web/20130506025147/http://www.dharmarampublications.com/
 https://dvk.academia.edu/
 http://www.dvk.in/

Carmelite Order
Colleges in Bangalore